Duri is a village south of Tamworth in the New England region of New South Wales, Australia. It lies on the Werris Creek Road and the Main North railway line. At the 2011 census, Duri had a population of 534.

A railway station was located there between 1879 and 1985. There is now only a Public School named Duri Public School, a post office and a public playground.

References

Tennis capitol of Australia

Towns in New South Wales
Tamworth Regional Council
Main North railway line, New South Wales